This is an incomplete list of painters in the collection of the Rijksmuseum, with the number of artworks represented, and sorted by century of birth. For more information about the collection which comprises more than 3,000 paintings, see Rijksmuseum. More than 300 works are by unknown or anonymous painters, and though over 1,000 individual artists are in the collection, many of these are represented by only one work. The highlights of the collection are the oldest works such as former altarpieces from Amsterdam churches, but also large works for other former Amsterdam institutions by Pieter Aertsen, Rembrandt, Nicolaes Maes, and Bartholomeus van der Helst. Most of the artists in the collection were born in the 16th and 17th centuries. Only 24 women are represented with works in the collection, most notably Judith Leyster, Gesina ter Borch, Catharina van Hemessen and Rachel Ruysch.

Born before 1500 
Bellini, Giovanni (Venice, 1435 – Venice, 1516), 4 works
Bosch, Jheronimus (Den Bosch, 1450 – Den Bosch, 1516), 8 works
Bulgarini, Bartolommeo (Siena, 1310 – Siena, 1378), 1 work
Cima da Conegliano (Conegliano, ca. 1459 – Conegliano, 1517/18), 1 work
Leyden, Aertgen Claeszoon van (Leiden, 1498 – Leiden, 1564), 2 works
Claeszoon, Allaert (1480 – 1508), 1 work
Cleve, Joos van (Kleef, 1485 – Antwerp, 1541), 4 works
Cock, Jan Wellens de (Leiden, 1480 – Antwerp, 1527), 4 works
Coninxloo, Jan van (Brussels, 1489 – 1565), 1 work
Kunst, Cornelis Corneliszoon (Leiden, 1493 – Leiden, 1544), 3 works
Oostsanen, Jacob Corneliszoon van (Oostzaan, 1472 – Amsterdam, 1533), 5 works
Coter, Colijn de (Brussels, 1450 – Brussels, 1532), 1 work
Coustens, Pieter (Bruges, 1453 – Brussels, 1487), 2 works
Cranach, Lucas (Kronach, 1472 – Weimar, 1553), 1 work
Crivelli, Carlo (Venice, 1430/35 – Camerino, 1495), 2 works
Crivelli, Vittore (Venice, ca. 1440 – Venice, 1501/2), 2 works
David, Gerard (Oudewater, 1460 – Bruges, 1523), 2 works
Dürer, Albrecht (Nuremberg, 1471 – Nuremberg, 1528), 1 work
Engebrechtszoon, Cornelis (Leiden, 1468 – Leiden, 1533), 5 works
Eyck, Barthélemy d' (France, 1444 – France, 1469), 1 work
Geertgen tot Sint Jans (Haarlem, 1460 – Haarlem, 1495), 2 works
Giovanni di Paolo di Grazia (Siena, 1399 – Siena, 1482), 1 work
Libri, Girolamo dai (Verona, 1474 – Verona, 1555), 1 work
Goes, Hugo van der (Ghent, 1440 – Auderghem, 1482), 1 work
Gossaert, Jan (Maubeuge, 1478 – Middelburg, 1532), 1 work
Heemskerck, Maarten van (Heemskerk, 1498 – Haarlem, 1574), 11 works
Isenbrant, Adriaen (Bruges, 1485 – Bruges, 1551), 1 work
Jacobello del Fiore (died Venice, 1439), 2 works
Jacobszoon, Dirck (Amsterdam, 1497 – Amsterdam, 1567), 7 works
Joest van Calcar, Jan (Kalkar, 1450 – Haarlem, 1519), 1 work
Leyden, Lucas van (Leiden, 1494 – Leiden, 1533), 5 works
Di Tommè, Luca (Siena, 1356 – Siena, 1389), 1 work
Massijs, Quinten (Leuven, 1466 – Antwerp, 1530), 3 works
Master of Alkmaar (Alkmaar, 1475 – Alkmaar, 1515), 23 works
Master of Delft (born Delft, 1470), 4 works
Master of Frankfurt (Antwerp, 1460 – 1520), 1 work
Master of Rhenen (1480 – 1520), 1 work
Master of the Spes Nostra (Delft, 1480 – 1520), 1 work
Master of the Legend of St. Ursula (Bruges) (Bruges, 1436 – Bruges, 1505), 1 work
Master of the Lille Adoration (Antwerp, 1510 – Antwerp, 1530), 1 work
Master of the Amsterdam Death of the Virgin (Amsterdam, 1480 – Utrecht, 1500), 4 works
Master of Badia a Isola (active c. 1290 – 1320), 1 work
Master of the St. Elizabeth Panels (1480 – 1500), 4 works
Master of the Figdor Deposition (1480 – 1500), 2 works
Master of the legend of St. Barbara (1470 – 1500), 1 work
Master of the Legend of the Magdalen (Brussels, 1483 – Brussels, 1530), 2 works
Master of the Virgo inter Virgines (Delft, 1450 – Delft, 1505), 3 works
Master of the St. John's Altarpiece (1400 – 1499), 1 work
Montagna, Bartolomeo (Orzinuovi, ca. 1450 – Vicenza, 1523), 1 work
Mostaert, Jan (Haarlem, 1465 – Haarlem, 1553), 6 works
Orcagna, Andrea di Cione (Florence, 1320 – Florence, 1368), 1 work
Orley, Bernard van (Brussels, 1490 – Brussels, 1541), 1 work
Patinir, Joachim (Antwerp, 1480 – Antwerp, 1524), 1 work
Piero di Cosimo (Florence, 1462 – Florence, 1521), 2 works
Provoost, Jan (Mons, 1462 – Bruges, 1529), 1 work
Reymerswale, Marinus van (Reimerswaal, 1490 – Goes, 1546), 1 work
Rondinello, Nicolò (Venice, 1495 – Ravenna, 1501), 1 work
Scorel, Jan van (Schoorl, 1495 – Utrecht, 1562), 14 works
Squarcione, Francesco (Padua, 1397 – Padua, 1468), 1 work
Swart van Groningen, Jan (Groningen, 1495 – Antwerp, 1560), 1 work
Vecchietta, Lorenzo di Pietro (Castiglione di Val d'Orcia, ca. 1412 – Siena, 0), 1 work
Vivarini, Bartolomeo (Murano, 1432 – Murano, 1499), 2 works
Weyden, Rogier van der (Tournai, 1400 – Brussels, 1464), 1 work

Born in the 16th century
Aerts, Hendrick (1570 – 1628), 1 work
Aertsen, Pieter (Amsterdam, 1508 – Amsterdam, 1575), 8 works
Anonymous Antwerp Mannerist (Antwerp, 1500 – 1530), 2 works
Antum, Aert van (Antwerp, 1579 – Amsterdam, 1620), 2 works
Anthoniszoon, Cornelis (Amsterdam, 1505 – Amsterdam, 1552), 2 works
Arentszoon or Cabel, Arent (Amsterdam, 1585 – Amsterdam, 1631), 2 works
Ast, Balthasar van der (Middelburg, 1593 – Delft, 1656), 2 works
Avercamp, Hendrick (Amsterdam, 1585 – Kampen, 1634), 4 works
Baburen, Dirck van (Wijk bij Duurstede, 1595 – Utrecht, 1624), 2 works
Bailly, David (Leiden, 1584 – Leiden, 1657), 3 works
Balten, Pieter (Antwerp, 1525 – Antwerp, 1584), 2 works
Barendszoon, Dirck (Amsterdam, 1534 – Amsterdam, 1592), 5 works
Bassen, Bartholomeus van (Antwerp, 1590 – The Hague, 1652), 3 works
Beert, Osias (Antwerp, 1580 – Antwerp, 1623), 2 works
Beuckelaer, Joachim (Antwerp, 1533 – Antwerp, 1574), 2 works
Bijlert, Jan van (Utrecht, 1597 – Utrecht, 1671), 2 works
Bles, Herri met de (Dinant, c151 – Antwerp, 1510), 1 work
Blocklandt van Montfoort, Anthonie (Montfoort, 1533 – Utrecht, 1583), 1 work
Bloemaert, Abraham (Gorinchem, 1564 – Utrecht, 1651), 3 works
Bol, Cornelis (Antwerp, 1589 – Haarlem, 1666), 1 work
Bollongier, Hans Gilliszoon (Haarlem, 1600 – Haarlem, 1673), 1 work
Borculo, Nicolaes van (1565 – 1643), 1 work
Bosschaert, Ambrosius (Antwerp, 1573 – The Hague, 1621), 1 work
Bramer, Leonaert (Delft, 1596 – Delft, 1674), 2 works
Breen, Adam van (Amsterdam, 1585 – Amsterdam, 1642), 2 works
Breenbergh, Bartholomeus (Deventer, 1598 – Amsterdam, 1657), 2 works
Bril, Paul (Antwerp, 1554 – Rome, 1626), 2 works
Brueghel, Jan (Brussels, 1568 – Antwerp, 1624), 6 works
Terbrugghen, Hendrick (Deventer, 1588 – Utrecht, 1629), 4 works
Buesem, Jan Janszoon (1599 – 1649), 1 work
Bundel, Willem van den (Brussels, 1575 – Delft, 1655), 1 work
Bunel, Jacob (Blois, 1568 – Paris, 1614), 1 work
Buys, Cornelis Corneliszoon (II) (1504 – 1545), 5 works
Caullery, Louis de (Cambrai, c.1580 – Antwerp, 1621), 2 works
Claeszoon, Pieter (Berchem, 1597 – Haarlem, 1660), 5 works
Clerck, Hendrik de (Brussels, 1570 – Brussels, 1630), 2 works
Codde, Pieter (Amsterdam, 1599 – Amsterdam, 1678), 5 works
Coffermans, Marcellus (1520 – 578 ), 1 work
Coignet, Gillis (Antwerp, 1542 – Antwerp, 1599), 1 work
Colijns, David (Rotterdam, 1582 – Amsterdam, 1667), 1 work
Cool, Jan Daemen (Rotterdam, 1589 – Rotterdam, 1660), 1 work
Haarlem, Cornelis Corneliszoon van (Haarlem, 1562 – Haarlem, 1637), 7 works
Crabeth, Wouter Pieterszoon (Gouda, 1594 – Gouda, 1643), 1 work
Crayer, Gaspar de (Antwerp, 1582 – Ghent, 1669), 2 works
Cronenburg, Adriaen (Bergum, 1540 – Schagen, 1603), 2 works
Cuyp, Jacob Gerritszoon (Dordrecht, 1594 – Dordrecht, 1652), 2 works
Dalem, Cornelis van (Antwerp, 1530 – Breda, 1576), 1 work
Delff, Cornelis Jacobszoon (Gouda, 1570 – Delft, 1643), 1 work
Delff, Jacob Willemszoon (Delft, 1550 – Delft, 1601), 3 works
Delff, Willem Jacobszoon (Delft, 1580 – Delft, 1638), 2 works
Droochsloot, Joost Corneliszoon (Utrecht, 1586 – Utrecht, 1666), 2 works
Dubus, Mathieu (Flanders, 1590 – The Hague, 1665), 1 work
Duyster, Willem Corneliszoon (Amsterdam, 1599 – Amsterdam, 1635), 5 works
Dyck, Anthony van (Antwerp, 1599 – London, 1641), 15 works
Dyck, Floris van (Haarlem, 1575 – Haarlem, 1651), 1 work
Eertvelt, Andries van (Antwerp, 1590 – Antwerp, 1652), 2 works
Elias, Isaac (Amsterdam, 1590 – 1630), 1 work
Engelszoon, Cornelis (Gouda, 1574 – Haarlem, 1650), 6 works
Fogolino, Marcello (Vicenza, ca. 1485 – Vicenza, after 1548), 1 work
Franchoys, Lucas (Antwerp, 1574 – Antwerp, 1643), 1 work
Francken, Frans (Antwerp, 1581 – Antwerp, 1642), 3 works
Gardijn, Guilliam du (Cologne, 1595 – Amsterdam, 1653), 1 work
Geel, Jacob van (Middelburg, 1585 – Dordrecht, 1648), 1 work
Geest, Wybrand de (Leeuwarden, 1592 – Leeuwarden, 1661), 16 works
Geldorp, Gortzius (Leuven, 1553 – Cologne, 1618), 9 works
Gheyn, Jacob de (Antwerp, 1565 – The Hague, 1629), 1 work
Girolamo da Treviso (Treviso, ca. 1497 – Boulogne-sur-Mer, 1544), 1 work
Goltzius, Hendrick (Mulbracht, 1558 – Haarlem, 1617), 3 works
Goyen, Jan Josefszoon van (Leiden, 1596 – The Hague, 1656), 9 works
Guercino (Cento, 1591 – Bologna, 1666), 1 work
Hals, Dirck (Haarlem, 1591 – Haarlem, 1656), 2 works
Hals, Frans (Antwerp, 1582 – Haarlem, 1666), 11 works
Heck, Claes Dirckszoon van der (Alkmaar, 1595 – Alkmaar, 1649), 2 works
Heda, Willem Claeszoon (Haarlem, 1594 – Haarlem, 1680), 3 works
Hemessen, Catharina van (Antwerp, 1528 – Antwerp, 1587), 1 work
Hemessen, Jan van (Hemiksem, 1500 – Haarlem, 1575), 1 work
Henrixz, Simon (1580 – 1630), 1 work
Hillegaert, Paulus van (Amsterdam, 1596 – Amsterdam, 1640), 9 works
Hilliard, Nicholas (Exeter, 1537 – London, 1619), 1 work
Hondecoeter, Gillis Claeszoon de (Antwerp, 1575 – Amsterdam, 1658), 2 works
Honthorst, Gerard van (Utrecht, 1592 – Utrecht, 1656), 20 works
Honthorst, Willem van (Utrecht, 1594 – Utrecht, 1666), 1 work
Hoogstraten, Dirk van (Antwerp, 1596 – Dordrecht, 1640), 1 work
Isaacszoon, Isaac (1599 – 1665), 1 work
Isaacszoon, Pieter (Helsingør, 1569 – Amsterdam, 1625), 2 works
Jacobszoon, Lambert (Amsterdam, 1598 – Leeuwarden, 1636), 1 work
Jonson van Ceulen, Cornelis (London, 1593 – Utrecht, 1661), 5 works
Jordaens, Jacob (Antwerp, 1593 – Antwerp, 1678), 7 works
Kessler, Franz (Wetzlar, c.1580 – Gdańsk, 1650), 1 work
Ketel, Cornelis (Gouda, 1548 – Amsterdam, 1616), 10 works
Keuninck, Kerstiaen de (Kortrijk, 1560 – Antwerp, 1632), 1 work
Key, Adriaen Thomaszoon (Antwerp, 1544 – Antwerp, 1589), 4 works
Key, Willem (Breda, 1515 – Antwerp, 1568), 2 works
Keyser, Thomas de (Amsterdam, 1596 – Amsterdam, 1667), 11 works
Kilian, Lucas (Augsburg, 1579 – Augsburg, 1637), 1 work
Knibbergen, François van (Utrecht, 1596 – The Hague, 1674), 1 work
Laer, Pieter van (Haarlem, 1592 – Haarlem, 1642), 2 works
Lastman, Nicolaes (Amsterdam, 1585 – Amsterdam, 1625), 1 work
Lastman, Pieter (Amsterdam, 1583 – Amsterdam, 1633), 3 works
Le Nain, Matthieu (Laon, 1593 – Paris, 1648/1677), 1 work
Loncke, Jacob Lambrechtszoon (Zierikzee, 1580 – Zierikzee, 1656), 2 works
Malo, Vincent (Cambrai, 1595 – Rome, 1649), 1 work
Massijs, Cornelis (Antwerp, 1510 – Antwerp, 1557), 1 work
Mast, Herman van der (1550 – 1610), 2 works
Master with the Parrot (Antwerp, 1525 – Antwerp, 1550), 1 work
Master of the Good Samaritan (Utrecht, 1530 – 1550), 1 work
Master of the Brunswick Diptych, 2 works
Master of the Portraits of Princes (Antwerp, 1530 – Antwerp, 1560), 1 work
Master of the Female Half-Lengths (Antwerp, 1500 – Antwerp, 1540), 2 works
Master of the Moucheron family portrait (Antwerp, 1563 – Antwerp, 1563), 1 work
Master the Antwerp family portraits (Amsterdam, 1540 – Amsterdam, 1560), 1 work
Master of the Adie Lambertsz Portrait (Friesland, 1582 –  1628), 1 work
Mierevelt, Michiel Jansz. van (Delft, 1567 – Delft, 1641), 41 works
Mirou, Anthonie (Antwerp, 1578 – Frankenthal, 1627), 1 work
Moeyaert, Nicolaes (Durgerdam, 1592 – Amsterdam, 1655), 2 works
Mol, Peter van (Antwerp, 1599 – Paris, 1650), 1 work
Molijn, Pieter de (London, 1595 – Haarlem, 1661), 1 work
Momper, Joos de (Antwerp, 1564 – Antwerp, 1635), 5 works
Amstel, Jan van (Amsterdam, c150 – Antwerp, 1540), 2 works
Moreelse, Paulus (Utrecht, 1571 – Utrecht, 1638), 6 works
Moro, Antonio (Utrecht, 1520 – Antwerp, 1576), 5 works
Mostaert, Gillis (Hulst, 1528 – Antwerp, 1598), 1 work
Neefs, Pieter (Antwerp, 1568 – Antwerp, 1656), 2 works
Neyn, Pieter de (Leiden, 1597 – Leiden, 1638), 1 work
Nieulandt, Adriaen van (Antwerp, 1587 – Amsterdam, 1658), 4 works
Nieulandt, Jacob van (Amsterdam, 1593 – Amsterdam, 1634), 1 work
Nieulandt, Willem van (Antwerp, 1584 – Amsterdam, 1635), 1 work
Passe II, Crispijn van de (Cologne, 1594 – Amsterdam, 1670), 2 works
Peeters, Clara (Antwerp, 1580 – Antwerp, 1641), 1 work
Pickenoy, Nicolaes Eliasz. (Amsterdam, 1588 – Amsterdam, 1655), 17 works
Pietersz., Aert (Amsterdam, 1550 – Amsterdam, 1612), 7 works
Pietersz., Pieter (Antwerp, 1540 – Amsterdam, 1603), 7 works
Poelenburch, Cornelis van (Utrecht, 1595 – Utrecht, 1667), 6 works
Porcellis, Jan (Ghent, 1584 – Zoeterwoude, 1632), 1 work
Pot, Hendrik Cornelisz (Amsterdam, 1585 – Amsterdam, 1657), 1 work
Pourbus, Frans (Bruges, 1545 – Antwerp, 1581), 1 work
Pourbus, Frans (Antwerp, 1569 – Paris, 1622), 3 works
Pourbus, Pieter (Gouda, 1523 – Bruges, 1584), 3 works
Pynas, Jacob Symonsz. (Haarlem, 1592 – Delft, 1650), 1 work
Pynas, Jan Symonsz. (Alkmaar, 1582 – Amsterdam, 1631), 2 works
Ravesteyn, Jan Antonisz. van (The Hague, 1572 – The Hague, 1657), 35 works
Rubens, Peter Paul (Antwerp, 1577 – Antwerp, 1640), 6 works
Saenredam, Pieter Jansz. (Assendelft, 1597 – Haarlem, 1665), 4 works
Sarburgh, Bartholomäus (Trier, 1590 – The Hague, 1637), 1 work
Savery, Hans (Kortrijk, 1564 – Haarlem, 1623), 1 work
Savery, Hans (Haarlem, 1589 – Utrecht, 1654), 1 work
Savery, Roelant (Kortrijk, 1576 – Utrecht, 1639), 3 works
Schooten, Floris van (Haarlem, 1588 – Haarlem, 1656), 1 work
Schooten, Joris van (Leiden, 1587 – Leiden, 1651), 2 works
Scrots, Guillaume (England, 1537 – England, 1553), 1 work
Seghers, Gerard (Antwerp, 1591 – Antwerp, 1651), 1 work
Seghers, Daniël (Antwerp, 1590 – Antwerp, 1661), 1 work
Snayers, Peter (Antwerp, 1592 – Brussels, 1666), 1 work
Snijders, Frans (Antwerp, 1579 – Antwerp, 1657), 1 work
Stalbemt, Adriaen van (Antwerp, 1580 – Antwerp, 1660), 1 work
Stap, Jan Woutersz (Amsterdam, 1599 – Amsterdam, 1663), 2 works
Sustris, Lambert (Amsterdam, 1515 – Venice, 1591), 1 work
Swanenburg, Isaac Claesz. van (Leiden, 1537 – Leiden, 1614), 1 work
Sweelink, Gerrit Pietersz. (Amsterdam, 1566 – Amsterdam, 1612), 1 work
Swinderen, Johannes van (Zutphen, 1594 – Zutphen, 1636), 1 work
Tengnagel, Jan (Amsterdam, 1584 – Amsterdam, 1635), 2 works
Tintoretto (Venice, 1518 – Venice, 1594), 2 works
Torrentius, Johannes (Amsterdam, 1589 – Amsterdam, 1644), 1 work
Valkenborch, Frederik van (Antwerp, 1566 – Nuremberg, 1623), 1 work
Valckert, Werner van den (Amsterdam, 1585 – Delft, 1645), 7 works
Veen, Otto van (Leiden, 1556 – Brussels, 1629), 13 works
Velde, Esaias van de (Amsterdam, 1587 – The Hague, 1630), 6 works
Velde, Jan van de (Delft, 1593 – Enkhuizen, 1641), 2 works
Venne, Adriaen Pietersz. van de (Delft, 1589 – The Hague, 1662), 22 works
Vermeyen, Jan Cornelisz. (Beverwijk, 1500 – Brussels, 1559), 4 works
Verspronck, Johannes Cornelisz. (Haarlem, 1600 – Haarlem, 1662), 8 works
Vinckboons, David (Mechelen, 1576 – Amsterdam, 1629), 5 works
Vliet, Willem van der (Delft, 1584 – Delft, 1642), 2 works
Vollenhoven, Herman van (1575 – 1628), 1 work
Voort, Cornelis van der (Antwerp, 1576 – Amsterdam, 1624), 14 works
Vos, Maerten de (Antwerp, 1532 – Antwerp, 1603), 1 work
Voskuijl, Huijgh Pietersz. (1591 – 1665), 2 works
Vrancx, Sebastiaan (Antwerp, 1573 – Antwerp, 1647), 4 works
Vredeman de Vries, Hans (Leeuwarden, 1527 – Amsterdam, 1607), 1 work
Vries, Abraham de (Rotterdam, 1590 – The Hague, 1655), 3 works
Vroom, Cornelis Hendriksz. (Haarlem, 1591 – Haarlem, 1661), 2 works
Vroom, Hendrik Cornelisz. (Haarlem, 1563 – Haarlem, 1640), 6 works
Waben, Jacques (Hoorn, 1590 – Hoorn, 1634), 1 work
Wechelen, Jan van (Antwerp, 1557 – 1557), 1 work
Wieringa, Harmen Willems (1597 – 1644), 3 works
Wieringen, Cornelis Claesz. van (Haarlem, 1580 – Haarlem, 1633), 1 work
Wildens, Jan (Antwerp, 1595 – Antwerp, 1653), 1 work
Willaerts, Adam (London, 1577 – Utrecht, 1664), 6 works
Wtenbrouck, Moyses van (The Hague, 1590 – The Hague, 1648), 2 works
Wtewael, Joachim (Utrecht, 1566 – Utrecht, 1638), 1 work
Zeeuw, Cornelis de (Antwerp, 1558 – Antwerp, 1569), 1 work

Born in the 17th century
Accama, Bernard (Leeuwarden, 1697 – Leeuwarden, 1756), 2 works
Aelst, Willem van (Delft, 1627 – Amsterdam, 1683), 1 work
Alewijn, Abraham (Amsterdam, 1664 – Batavia, 1721), 1 work
Anraedt, Pieter van (Utrecht, 1635 – Deventer, 1678), 5 works
Anthonissen, Hendrick van (Amsterdam, 1605 – Amsterdam, 1656), 2 works
Appel, Jacob (Amsterdam, 1680 – Amsterdam, 1751), 2 works
Asch, Pieter Jansz. van (Delft, 1603 – Delft, 1678), 1 work
Asselijn, Jan (Diemen or Dieppe, 1615 – Amsterdam, 1652), 5 works
Assen, Jan van (Amsterdam, 1635 – Amsterdam, 1695), 1 work
Attama, J. (1655 – Groningen, 1659), 2 works
Avercamp, Barend (Kampen, 1612 – Kampen, 1679), 1 work
Backer, Adriaen (Amsterdam, 1609 – Amsterdam, 1685), 5 works
Backer, Jacob Adriaensz. (Harlingen, 1608 – Amsterdam, 1651), 7 works
Baen, Jan de (Haarlem, 1633 – The Hague, 1702), 8 works
Bakhuizen, Ludolf (Emden, 1631 – Amsterdam, 1708), 24 works
Ban, Gerbrand (Haarlem, 1612 – Amsterdam, 1652), 1 work
Bary, Hendrik (Gouda, 1640 – Gouda, 1707), 1 work
Batist, Karel (1650 – 1663), 1 work
Beeckman, Andries (Zutphen, 1630 – Indonesia, 1663), 1 work
Beeldemaker, Adriaen Cornelisz. (Rotterdam, 1618 – The Hague, 1709), 2 works
Beelt, Cornelis (Rotterdam, 1607 – Haarlem or Rotterdam, 1664), 1 work
Beerstraaten, Abraham (Amsterdam, 1643 – Amsterdam, 1675), 3 works
Beerstraaten, Jan Abrahamsz. (Amsterdam, 1622 – Amsterdam, 1666), 7 works
Beest, Sybrand van (The Hague, c.1610 – Amsterdam, 1674), 2 works
Beet, Cornelis de (Utrecht, 1620 – Veenendaal, 1653), 1 work
Bega, Cornelis Pietersz. (Haarlem, 1620 – Haarlem, 1664), 2 works
Begeyn, Abraham Jansz. (Leiden, 1637 – Berlin, 1697), 1 work
Beijeren, Abraham van (The Hague, 1620 – Overschie, 1690), 8 works
Bellevois, Jacob Adriaensz. (Rotterdam, 1621 – Rotterdam, 1676), 2 works
Berchem, Nicolaes Pietersz. (Haarlem, 1620 – Amsterdam, 1683), 13 works
Berckheyde, Gerrit Adriaensz. (Haarlem, 1638 – Haarlem, 1698), 10 works
Berckheyde, Job Adriaensz. (Haarlem, 1630 – Haarlem, 1692), 2 works
Berckman, Hendrick (Klundert, 1629 – Middelburg, 1678), 4 works
Bergen, Dirck van (Haarlem, 1645 – Haarlem, 1689), 3 works
Bertin, Nicolas (Paris, 1668 – Paris, 1736), 2 works
Bie, Cornelis de (Lier, 1627 – Lier, 1711), 1 work
Bisschop, Cornelis (Dordrecht, 1630 – Dordrecht, 1674), 2 works
Blanchard, Jacques (Paris, 1600 – Paris, 1638), 1 work
Blarenberghe, Hendrick van (Bailleul, 1646 – Lille, 1712), 1 work
Bleker, Dirck (Haarlem, 1621 – Haarlem, 1690), 1 work
Blieck, Daniël de (Middelburg, 1610 – Middelburg, 1673), 1 work
Blijhooft, Zacharias (Haarlem, 1630 – Middelburg, 1682), 2 works
Bloemaert, Hendrick (Utrecht, 1601 – Utrecht, 1672), 3 works
Bloemen, Norbert van (Antwerp, 1670 – Amsterdam, 1746), 1 work
Bloot, Pieter de (Rotterdam, 1601 – Rotterdam, 1658), 1 work
Bol, Ferdinand (Dordrecht, 1616 – Amsterdam, 1680), 20 works
Boone, Daniël (1630 – 1688), 2 works
Boonen, Arnold (Dordrecht, 1669 – Amsterdam, 1729), 14 works
Bor, Paulus (Amersfoort, 1601 – Amersfoort, 1669), 2 works
Borch, Gerard ter (Zwolle, 1617 – Deventer, 1681), 19 works
Borch, Gesina ter (Zwolle, 1633 – Deventer, 1690), 1 work
Borch, Jan (Zwolle, 1600 – Zwolle, 1646), 1 work
Borman, Johannes (The Hague, 1620 – Amsterdam, 1679), 1 work
Borselaer, Pieter (Middelburg, 1633 – London, 1687), 2 works
Borssom, Anthonie van (Amsterdam, 1631 – Amsterdam, 1677), 2 works
Bosch, Hendrik van den (Amsterdam, 1692 – Batavia, 1736), 1 work
Both, Andries (Utrecht, 1612 – Venice, 1642), 1 work
Both, Jan (Utrecht, 1618 – Utrecht, 1652), 6 works
Boudewijns, Adriaen Fransz (Brussels, 1644 – Brussels, 1719), 1 work
Boursse, Esaias (Amsterdam, 1631 – at sea, 1672), 1 work
Bout, Pieter (Brussels, 1630 – Brussels, 1700), 2 works
Brakenburgh, Richard (Haarlem, 1650 – Haarlem, 1702), 2 works
Bray, Dirck de (Haarlem, 1635 – Haarlem, 1694), 2 works
Bray, Jan de (Haarlem, 1627 – Haarlem, 1697), 3 works
Brekelenkam, Quiringh Gerritsz. van (Zwammerdam, 1622 – Leiden, 1670), 6 works
Brisé, Cornelis (Haarlem, 1622 – Amsterdam, 1669), 2 works
Broeck, Elias van den (Antwerp, 1649 – Amsterdam, 1708), 2 works
Bronckhorst, Jan Gerritsz. van (Utrecht, 1603 – Amsterdam, 1661), 1 work
Brouwer, Adriaen (Oudenaarde, 1605 – Antwerp, 1638), 8 works
Bruyn, Cornelis de (Utrecht, 1652 – Utrecht, 1726), 1 work
Burgh, Hendrick van der (Delft, 1627 – Delft, 1664), 2 works
Burgh, R. van (1658 – 1688), 1 work
Buytewech, Willem Willemsz. (Rotterdam, 1624 – Rotterdam, 1670), 2 works
Calraet, Abraham van (Dordrecht, 1642 – Dordrecht, 1722), 1 work
Camerarius, Adam (died 1666), 1 work
Camphuysen, Govert Dircksz. (Gorinchem, 1623 – Amsterdam, 1672), 1 work
Cappelle, Jan van de (Amsterdam, 1626 – Amsterdam, 1679), 4 works
Carlevarijs, Luca (Udine, 1663 – Venice, 1730), 1 work
Carré, Hendrik (Amsterdam, 1656 – The Hague, 1720), 1 work
Carré, Hendrik (The Hague, 1696 – The Hague, 1775), 2 works
Cerezo, Mateo the Younger (Burgos, 1637 – Madrid, 1666), 1 work
Claesz, Jan (died d.1636 ), 3 works
Claeuw, Jacques de (Dordrecht, 1623 – Leiden, 1694), 1 work
Coeman, Jacob (Amsterdam, 1632 – Batavia, 1676), 2 works
Colasius, Johan George (Utrecht, 1698 – Utrecht, 1736), 1 work
Collier, Edwaert (Breda, 1642 – London, 1708), 1 work
Colonia, Adam (Rotterdam, 1634 – London, 1685), 1 work
Conflans, Adriaen van (died 1607), 1 work
Coninck, David de (Antwerp, 1642 – Brussels, 1701), 3 works
Coorte, Adriaen (Middelburg, 1660 – Middelburg, 1707), 4 works
Craey, Dirck (1600 – 1665), 2 works
Cuyp, Aelbert (Dordrecht, 1620 – Dordrecht, 1691), 8 works
Cuyp, Benjamin Gerritsz. (Dordrecht, 1612 – Dordrecht, 1652), 3 works
Dalens, Dirck (Dordrecht, 1600 – Zierikzee, 1676), 1 work
Danckerts de Rij, Pieter (Amsterdam, 1605 – Rudnik nad Sanem, 1660), 1 work
Decker, Cornelis Gerritsz. (Haarlem, 1618 – Haarlem, 1678), 1 work
Decker, Frans (Haarlem, 1684 – Haarlem, 1751), 1 work
Delen, Dirck van (Heusden, 1605 – Arnemuiden, 1671), 5 works
Delff, Jacob Willemsz. (Delft, 1619 – Delft, 1661), 3 works
Denner, Balthasar (Altona, 1685 – Rostock, 1749), 2 works
Diepraam, Abraham (Rotterdam, 1622 – Rotterdam, 1670), 1 work
Diest, Jeronymus van (The Hague, 1631 – The Hague, 1687), 2 works
Diest, Johan van (1695 – 1757), 1 work
Diest, Willem van (The Hague, 1600 – The Hague, 1678), 1 work
Dijck, Abraham van (Amsterdam, 1635 – Dordrecht, 1680), 1 work
Dijk, Philip van (Oud-Beijerland, 1683 – The Hague, 1753), 15 works
Doomer, Lambert (Amsterdam, 1624 – Amsterdam, 1700), 1 work
Dou, Gerard (Leiden, 1613 – Leiden, 1675), 7 works
Dowe, Douwe Juwes de (Leeuwarden, 1608 – 1663), 1 work
Droochsloot, Cornelis (Utrecht, 1630 – Utrecht, 1673), 1 work
Druyf, Dirk (Leiden, 1610 – 1699), 1 work
Dubois, Guillam (Haarlem, 1623 – Haarlem, 1661), 1 work
Dubbels, Hendrick Jacobsz. (Amsterdam, 1621 – Amsterdam, 1707), 3 works
Dubois, Simon (Antwerp, 1632 – London, 1708), 2 works
Dubordieu, Pieter (L'Île-Bouchard, 1609 – Amsterdam, 1678), 3 works
Duck, Jacob (Utrecht, 1600 – Utrecht, 1667), 2 works
Dujardin, Karel (Amsterdam, 1626 – Venice, 1678), 9 works
Dusart, Christiaen Jansz (Antwerp, 1618 – Amsterdam, 1682), 1 work
Dusart, Cornelis (Haarlem, 1660 – Haarlem, 1704), 1 work
Duynen, Isaac van (Dordrecht, 1628 – The Hague, 1681), 1 work
Eeckhout, Gerbrand van den (Amsterdam, 1621 – Amsterdam, 1674), 4 works
Egmondt, Pieter Cornelisz (Leiden, 1618 – 1673), 1 work
Elliger, Ottmar (Göteborg, 1633 – Berlin, 1679), 2 works
Esselens, Jacob (Amsterdam, 1626 – Amsterdam, 1687), 2 works
Essen, Jan van (Antwerp, 1640 – Naples, 1684), 1 work
Everdingen, Allaert van (Alkmaar, 1621 – Amsterdam, 1675), 3 works
Everdingen, Cesar Boetius van (Alkmaar, 1617 – Alkmaar, 1678), 4 works
Eversdijck, Willem (Goes, 1618 – Middelburg, 1671), 4 works
Eyck, Nicolaas van (Antwerp, 1617 – Antwerp, 1679), 1 work
Fabritius, Barent (Middenbeemster, 1624 – Amsterdam, 1673), 4 works
Fabritius, Carel (Middenbeemster, 1622 – Delft, 1654), 3 works
Falens, Carel van (Antwerp, 1683 – Paris, 1733), 1 work
Ferguson, Henry (The Hague, 1665 – Toulouse, 1730), 1 work
Ferguson, William Gowe (Scotland, 1632 – Scotland, 1700), 2 works
Flinck, Govert (Cleves, 1615 – Amsterdam, 1660), 12 works
Gallis, Pieter (Enkhuizen, 1633 – Hoorn, 1697), 2 works
Geel, Joost van (Rotterdam, 1631 – Rotterdam, 1698), 1 work
Gelder, Aert de (Dordrecht, 1645 – Dordrecht, 1727), 7 works
Genoels, Abraham (Antwerp, 1640 – Antwerp, 1723), 2 works
Gijsels, Peeter (Antwerp, 1621 – Antwerp, 1690), 2 works
Glauber, Johannes (Utrecht, 1646 – Schoonhoven, 1726), 9 works
Gool, Jan van (The Hague, 1685 – The Hague, 1763), 2 works
Goor, Gerrit van (died Amsterdam, 1695), 1 work
Gotingh, Jan van (died 1697), 1 work
Graat, Barend (Amsterdam, 1628 – Amsterdam, 1709), 5 works
Graef, Timotheus de (1640 – 1718), 1 work
Grebber, Pieter Fransz. de (Haarlem, 1600 – Haarlem, 1653), 1 work
Griffier, Jan (Amsterdam, 1646 – London, 1718), 1 work
Groenewegen, Pieter Anthonisz. van (Delft, 1600 – The Hague, 1658), 1 work
Gysaerts, Gualterus (Antwerp, 1649 – Mechelen, 1674), 1 work
Haagen, Joris van der (Arnhem, 1615 – The Hague, 1669), 3 works
Hackaert, Jan (Amsterdam, 1628 – Amsterdam, 1685), 4 works
Haensbergen, Jan van (Gorinchem, 1642 – The Hague, 1705), 2 works
Halen, Peter van (Amsterdam, 1673 – Amsterdam, 1732), 6 works
Hanneman, Adriaen (The Hague, 1603 – The Hague, 1671), 3 works
Hannot, Johannes (1633 – 1684), 1 work
Haringh, Daniël (The Hague, 1636 – The Hague, 1713), 2 works
Hecken, Abraham van den (Antwerp, 1610 – Amsterdam, 1655), 2 works
Heda, Gerret Willemsz. (Haarlem, 1622 – Haarlem, 1649), 1 work
Heem, Jan Davidsz. de (Utrecht, 1606 – Antwerp, 1683), 4 works
Heeremans, Thomas (Haarlem, 1641 – Haarlem, 1694), 1 work
Heerschop, Hendrick (Haarlem, 1626 – Haarlem, 1690), 2 works
Helmbreeker, Dirck (Haarlem, 1633 – Rome, 1696), 1 work
Helst, Bartholomeus van der (Haarlem, 1613 – Amsterdam, 1670), 16 works
Helst, Lodewijk van der (Amsterdam, 1642 – Amsterdam, 1693), 3 works
Helt, Jeremias van der (Antwerp, 1646 – 1676), 1 work
Hemert, Jan van (1620 – 1645), 1 work
Hennekyn, Paulus (1612 – 1672), 2 works
Heusch, Willem de (Utrecht, 1625 – Utrecht, 1692), 2 works
Heyden, Jan van der (Gorinchem, 1637 – Amsterdam, 1712), 4 works
Hobbema, Meindert (Amsterdam, 1638 – Amsterdam, 1709), 2 works
Hoet, Gerard (Zaltbommel, 1648 – The Hague, 1733), 2 works
Hogers, Jacob (Deventer, 1614 – Deventer, 1660), 3 works
Hollar, Wenzel (Prague, 1607 – London, 1677), 2 works
Holsteyn, Pieter (Haarlem, 1614 – Haarlem, 1673), 1 work
Hondecoeter, Gijsbert Gillisz. de (Utrecht, 1604 – Utrecht, 1653), 2 works
Hondecoeter, Melchior d' (Utrecht, 1636 – Amsterdam, 1695), 12 works
Hondius, Abraham Daniëlsz. (Rotterdam, 1631 – London, 1691), 2 works
Hondt, Lambert de (c.1640s – Brussels, 1709), 2 works
Hooch, Charles Cornelisz. De (Haarlem, 1603 – Utrecht, 1638), 1 work
Hooch, Pieter de (Rotterdam, 1629 – Amsterdam, 1683), 7 works
Horemans, Jan Josef (I) (Antwerp, 1682 – Antwerp, 1759), 1 work
Houbraken, Arnold (Dordrecht, 1660 – Amsterdam, 1719), 2 works
Houckgeest, Gerard (The Hague, 1600 – Bergen op Zoom, 1661), 1 work
Huchtenburg, Jan van (Haarlem, 1647 – Amsterdam, 1733), 3 works
Huysum, Jan van (Amsterdam, 1682 – Amsterdam, 1749), 6 works
Hulst, Frans de (Haarlem, 1606 – Haarlem, 1661), 1 work
Hupin, Jacques (active in mid-17th century), 1 work
Jacobsz., Juriaen (Hamburg, 1624 – Leeuwarden, 1685), 1 work
Jonson van Ceulen the Younger, Cornelis (London, 1634 – Utrecht, 1715), 1 work
Jongh, Claude de (Utrecht, 1605 – Utrecht, 1663), 1 work
Jongh, Jan de (The Hague, 1625 – Haarlem, 1674), 1 work
Jongh, Ludolf de (Overschie, 1616 – Rotterdam, 1679), 3 works
Kalf, Willem (Rotterdam, 1619 – Amsterdam, 1693), 3 works
Kamper, Godaert (Düsseldorf, 1614 – Leiden, 1679), 2 works
Kessel, Jan (Amsterdam, 1641 – Amsterdam, 1680), 3 works
Kessel, Jan van (Antwerp, 1626 – Antwerp, 1679), 1 work
Kick, Simon (Delft, 1603 – Amsterdam, 1652), 1 work
Klomp, Albert Jansz. (1616 – Amsterdam, 1688), 2 works
Kneller, Gottfried (Lübeck, 1646 – London, 1723), 3 works
Knüpfer, Nicolaes (Leipzig, 1609 – Utrecht, 1655), 2 works
Koets, Roelof (Zwolle, 1640 – Zwolle, 1725), 3 works
Koninck, Philips (Amsterdam, 1619 – Amsterdam, 1688), 5 works
Koninck, Salomon (Amsterdam, 1609 – Amsterdam, 1656), 1 work
Kuijl, Gerard van (Gorinchem, 1604 – Gorinchem, 1673), 3 works
Lachtropius, Nicolaes (Amsterdam, 1640 – Alphen aan den Rijn, 1700), 1 work
Lagoor, Johan de (Haarlem, 1620 – Haarlem, 1660), 1 work
Lairesse, Gerard de (Liège, 1640 – Amsterdam, 1711), 14 works
Landsberghs (1719 – 1719), 1 work
Leemans, Anthonie (The Hague, 1631 – Amsterdam, 1673), 1 work
Leemans, Johannes (The Hague, 1633 – The Hague, 1688), 1 work
Lelienbergh, Cornelis (1610 – 1676), 3 works
Lesire, Paulus (Dordrecht, 1611 – The Hague, 1664), 7 works
Leveck, Jacobus (Dordrecht, 1634 – Dordrecht, 1675), 1 work
Leyden, Jan van (Rotterdam, 1661 – Rotterdam, 1690s), 2 works
Leyster, Judith (Haarlem, 1609 – Heemstede, 1660), 2 works
Liedts, Abraham (died 1660), 1 work
Lievens, Jan (Leiden, 1607 – Amsterdam, 1674), 10 works
Lievens, Jan Andrea (Antwerp, c.1640 – Amsterdam, 1708), 2 works
Limborch, Hendrik van (1681 – 1759), 4 works
Lingelbach, Johannes (Frankfurt am Main, 1622 – Amsterdam, 1674), 14 works
Loef, Jacob Gerritsz (Enkhuizen, 1607 – Hoorn, 1670), 2 works
Loo, Jacob van (Sluis, 1614 – Paris, 1670), 4 works
Looten, Jan (Amsterdam, 1618 – England, 1683), 1 work
Lorme, Anthonie de (Doornik, 1610 – Rotterdam, 1673), 1 work
Lubienitzki, Christoffel (Szczecin, 1659 – Amsterdam, 1729), 5 works
Lundens, Gerrit (Amsterdam, 1622 – Amsterdam, 1683), 1 work
Luttichuys, Isaack (London, 1616 – Amsterdam, 1673), 2 works
Luttichuys, Simon (London, 1610 – Amsterdam, 1661), 1 work
Maes, Nicolaes (Dordrecht, 1634 – Amsterdam, 1693), 17 works
Man, Cornelis de (Delft, 1621 – Delft, 1706), 3 works
Marrel, Jacob (Frankenthal, 1613 – Frankfurt-am-Main, 1681), 2 works
Marseus van Schrieck, Otto (Nijmegen, 1619 – Amsterdam, 1678), 2 works
Martszen de Jonge, Jan (Haarlem, 1609 – Haarlem, 1647), 1 work
Matham, Theodor (Haarlem, 1605 – Amsterdam, 1676), 1 work
Maton, Bartholomeus (Leiden, 1641 – Stockholm, 1684), 1 work
Mazo, Juan Bautista Martinez del (Cuenca, Spain, 1610/15 – Madrid, 1667), 1 work
Meerhout, Jan (Gorinchem, 1630 – Amsterdam, 1677), 1 work
Meerman, Hendrik (1605 – 1650), 2 works
Meijer, Hendrick de (Rotterdam, 1620 – Rotterdam, 1689), 3 works
Mesdach, Salomon (Middelburg, c1600 – Middelburg, 1632), 9 works
Metsu, Gabriël (Leiden, 1629 – Amsterdam, 1667), 6 works
Meulen, Adam Frans van der (Brussels, 1632 – Paris, 1690), 1 work
Meyer, Jan de (Rotterdam, c1690 – Rotterdam, 1740), 1 work
Mieris, Frans van (Leiden, 1635 – Leiden, 1681), 4 works
Mieris, Frans van (Leiden, 1689 – Leiden, 1763), 3 works
Mieris, Willem van (Leiden, 1662 – Leiden, 1747), 4 works
Mignon, Abraham (Frankfurt am Main, 1640 – Utrecht, 1679), 7 works
Mij, Hieronymus van der (Leiden, 1687 – Leiden, 1761), 1 work
Mijn, Herman van der (Amsterdam, 1684 – London, 1741), 1 work
Mijtens, Daniël (The Hague, 1644 – The Hague, 1688), 1 work
Mijtens, Johannes (The Hague, 1614 – The Hague, 1670), 13 works
Molenaer, Jan Miense (Haarlem, 1610 – Haarlem, 1688), 1 work
Monogrammist I.W. (Pre-Rembrandtist) (1600 – 1699), 1 work
Monogrammist IVA (1645 – 1645), 1 work
Monogrammist LVDV (Laurens van der Veken) (Antwerp, 1600 –  1624), 1 work
Moor, Carel de (Leiden, 1655 – Warmond, 1738), 2 works
Moucheron, Frederik de (Emden, 1633 – Amsterdam, 1686), 2 works
Moucheron, Isaac de (Amsterdam, 1667 – Amsterdam, 1744), 1 work
Mulier, Pieter (Haarlem, 1600 – Haarlem, 1659), 1 work
Murant, Emanuel (Amsterdam, 1662 – Leeuwarden, 1700), 1 work
Murillo, Bartolomé Esteban (Sevilla, 1617 – Sevilla, 1682), 1 work
Musscher, Michiel van (Rotterdam, 1645 – Amsterdam, 1705), 9 works
Mytens, Martin (1648 – 1736), 1 work
Naiveu, Matthijs (Leiden, 1647 – Amsterdam, 1721), 2 works
Nason, Pieter (Amsterdam, 1612 – The Hague, 1690), 1 work
Neck, Jan van (Naarden, 1635 – Amsterdam, 1714), 1 work
Neer, Aert van der (Amsterdam, 1603 – Amsterdam, 1677), 6 works
Neer, Eglon van der (Amsterdam, 1634 – Düsseldorf, 1703), 1 work
Netscher, Caspar (Heidelberg, 1639 – The Hague, 1684), 21 works
Netscher, Constantijn (The Hague, 1668 – The Hague, 1723), 2 works
Netscher, Theodorus (Bordeaux, 1661 – The Hague, 1728), 3 works
Nickelen, Isaak van (Haarlem, 1632 – Haarlem, 1702), 1 work
Nolpe, Pieter (1613 – 1652), 1 work
Nooms, Reinier (Amsterdam, 1623 – Amsterdam, 1664), 6 works
Noordt, Jan van (Amsterdam, 1623 – Amsterdam, 1681), 3 works
Noort, Pieter van (1622 – 1672), 2 works
Nouts, Michiel (1628 – 1693), 1 work
Ochtervelt, Jacob (Rotterdam, 1634 – Amsterdam, 1682), 2 works
Odekerken, Willem van (Nijmegen, 1610 – Delft, 1677), 1 work
Oever, Hendrick ten (Zwolle, 1639 – Zwolle, 1716), 3 works
Olis, Jan (Gorinchem, 1610 – Heusden, 1676), 1 work
Ormea, Willem (Utrecht, 1610 – Utrecht, 1680), 1 work
Ostade, Adriaen van (Haarlem, 1610 – Haarlem, 1685), 10 works
Ostade, Isaac van (Haarlem, 1621 – Haarlem, 1649), 1 work
Ovens, Jürgen (Tonning, 1623 – Friedrichstadt, 1678), 4 works
Pacx, Henri Ambrosius (Amsterdam, 1603 – Amsterdam, 1668), 1 work
Paepe, Joost de (Antwerp, 0 – Rome, 1646), 1 work
Palamedesz., Anthonie (Delft, 1601 – Amsterdam, 1673), 8 works
Palin, Martin (1680 – Jakarta, 1700), 1 work
Peeters, Bonaventura (Antwerp, 1614 – Antwerp, 1652), 2 works
Peeters, Gillis (Antwerp, 1612 – Antwerp, 1653), 1 work
Peschier, N.L. (died 1660), 1 work
Picolet, Cornelis (Rotterdam, 1626 – Rotterdam, 1679), 1 work
Piemont, Nicolaes (Amsterdam, 1644 – Vollenhove, 1709), 3 works
Pijnacker, Adam (Schiedam, 1622 – Amsterdam, 1673), 6 works
Plas, David van der (Amsterdam, 1647 – Amsterdam, 1704), 3 works
Ploy, Willem Jansz. (Delft, 1655 – Delft, 1675), 2 works
Pluym, Karel van der (Leiden, 1625 – Leiden, 1672), 1 work
Poel, Egbert Lievensz. van der (Delft, 1621 – Rotterdam, 1664), 2 works
Poorter, Willem de (Haarlem, 1608 – Heusden, 1649), 1 work
Post, Frans Jansz. (Leiden, 1612 – Haarlem, 1680), 7 works
Potter, Paulus (Enkhuizen, 1625 – Amsterdam, 1654), 7 works
Putter, Pieter de (1605 – 1659), 1 work
Puytlinck, Christoffel (Roermond, 1640 – Roermond, 1680), 1 work
Quast, Pieter Jansz. (Amsterdam, 1606 – Amsterdam, 1647), 3 works
Quinkhard, Jan Maurits (Rees, 1688 – Amsterdam, 1772), 17 works
Reuter, Willem (Brussels, 1642 – Rome, 1681), 1 work
Rietschoof, Jan Claesz. (Hoorn, 1651 – Hoorn, 1719), 2 works
Rijckaert, David (Antwerp, 1612 – Antwerp, 1661), 2 works
Rijn, Rembrandt van (Leiden, 1606 – Amsterdam, 1669), 25 works
Rijsbrack, Pieter Andreas (Paris, 1685 – London, 1748), 1 work
Ring, Pieter de (Ypres, 1615 – Leiden, 1660), 1 work
Rocquette, Johan de la (1638 – 1694), 1 work
Roepel, Coenraet (The Hague, 1678 – The Hague, 1748), 2 works
Roestraeten, Pieter Gerritsz. van (Haarlem, 1630 – London, 1700), 1 work
Roghman, Roelant (Amsterdam, 1627 – Amsterdam, 1692), 3 works
Romeyn, Willem (Haarlem, 1624 – Haarlem, 1693), 3 works
Roosendael, Nicolaas (Hoorn, 1634 – Amsterdam, 1686), 1 work
Rossum, Jan van (Vianen, 1630 – Vianen, 1678), 2 works
Rotius, Jan Albertsz. (Medemblik, 1624 – Hoorn, 1666), 2 works
Ruisdael, Jacob Isaacksz. van (Haarlem, 1628 – Haarlem, 1682), 8 works
Ruysch, Rachel (The Hague, 1664 – Amsterdam, 1750), 2 works
Ruysdael, Jacob Salomonsz. van (Haarlem, 1629 – Haarlem, 1681), 1 work
Ruysdael, Salomon van (Naarden, 1602 – Haarlem, 1670), 4 works
Saftleven, Cornelis (Gorinchem, 1607 – Rotterdam, 1681), 4 works
Saftleven, Herman (Rotterdam, 1609 – Utrecht, 1685), 4 works
Sam, Engel (Rotterdam, 1699 – Amsterdam, 1769), 1 work
Sanders, Hercules (1606 – 1683), 1 work
Sandrart, Joachim von (Frankfurt, 1606 – Nuremberg, 1688), 3 works
Sant-Acker, Frans (Den Bosch, 1648 – Den Bosch, 1688), 1 work
Santen, Gerrit van (1609 – 1687), 1 work
Santvoort, Dirck Dircksz. van (Amsterdam, 1610 – Amsterdam, 1680), 8 works
Schaak, B. (1650 – 1699), 1 work
Schalcken, Godfried (Made, 1643 – The Hague, 1706), 7 works
Schellinks, Willem (Amsterdam, 1627 – Amsterdam, 1678), 1 work
Schey, Philip (1626 – 1626), 1 work
Schoor, Aelbert Jansz van der (Utrecht, 1603 – Utrecht, 1692), 1 work
Schurman, Anna Maria van (Cologne, 1607 – Friesland, 1678), 1 work
Schuylenburgh, Hendrik van (Middelburg, 1620 – Middelburg, 1689), 1 work
Slingelandt, Pieter Cornelisz. van (Leiden, 1640 – Leiden, 1691), 2 works
Sorgh, Hendrick Martensz. (Rotterdam, 1610 – Rotterdam, 1670), 5 works
Spilberg, Johannes (Düsseldorf, 1619 – Düsseldorf, 1690), 2 works
Staveren, Jan Adriaenszoon van (Leiden, 1614 – Leiden, 1669), 1 work
Steen, Jan Havicksz. (Leiden, 1626 – Leiden, 1679), 27 works
Steenwijck, Harmen (Delft, 1612 – Leiden, 1656), 1 work
Stom, Matthias (Amersfoort, 1600 – Sicily, 1650), 2 works
Stoop, Dirk (Utrecht, 1615 – Utrecht, 1686), 2 works
Stoop, Maerten (1610 – 1647), 1 work
Storck, Abraham (Amsterdam, 1644 – Amsterdam, 1708), 5 works
Storck, Jacobus (Amsterdam, 1641 – Amsterdam, 1700), 1 work
Swaerdecroon, Bernardus (1607 – 1654), 2 works
Swanenburgh, Willem van (Leiden, 1610 – Leiden, 1674), 2 works
Swanevelt, Herman van (Woerden, 1604 – Paris, 1655), 1 work
Sweerts, Michael (Brussels, 1618 – Goa, 1664), 8 works
Tempel, Abraham van den (Leeuwarden, 1622 – Amsterdam, 1672), 4 works
Teniers, David (Antwerp, 1610 – Brussels, 1690), 3 works
Thielen, Jan Philip van (Antwerp, 1618 – Antwerp, 1667), 1 work
Thivart, Daniel (Amsterdam, 1611 – Amsterdam, 1656), 1 work
Tol, Domenicus van (Bodegraven, 1635 – Leiden, 1676), 2 works
Toorenvliet, Jacob (Leiden, 1640 – Leiden, 1719), 2 works
Treck, Jan Janszoon (Amsterdam, 1605 – Amsterdam, 1652), 1 work
Troost, Cornelis (Amsterdam, 1697 – Amsterdam, 1750), 36 works
Tuer, Herbert (1600 – 1685), 2 works
Ulft, Jacob van der (Gorinchem, 1627 – Noordwijk, 1690), 3 works
Vaillant, Bernard (Lille, 1632 – Leiden, 1698), 2 works
Vaillant, Wallerant (Lille, 1623 – Amsterdam, 1677), 10 works
Valk, Hendrick (Leeuwarden, 1674 – Leeuwarden, 1714), 2 works
Valkenburg, Dirk (Amsterdam, 1675 – Amsterdam, 1721), 1 work
Velde, Adriaen van de (Amsterdam, 1636 – Amsterdam, 1672), 14 works
Velde, Jan van de (Haarlem, 1620 – Enkhuizen, 1662), 3 works
Velde, Peter van de (Antwerp, 1634 – Antwerp, 1723), 1 work
Velde, Willem van de (Leiden, 1633 – Londen, 1707), 16 works
Verelst, Herman (The Hague or Dordrecht, 1641 – London, 1702), 4 works
Verkolje, Jan (Amsterdam, 1650 – Delft, 1693), 6 works
Verkolje, Nicolaas (Delft, 1673 – Amsterdam, 1746), 2 works
Vermeer, Johannes (Delft, 1632 – Delft, 1675), 4 works
Verschuier, Lieve Pieterszoon (Rotterdam, 1627 – Rotterdam, 1686), 3 works
Vertangen, Daniel (Amsterdam, 1600 – Amsterdam, 1682), 2 works
Verwilt, François (Rotterdam, 1623 – Rotterdam, 1691), 1 work
Vianen, Paulus van (Prague, 1608 – Utrecht, 1652), 1 work
Victors, Jacomo (Amsterdam, 1640 – Amsterdam, 1705), 1 work
Victors, Jan (Amsterdam, 1619 – Indonesia, 1676), 3 works
Vlieger, Simon de (Rotterdam, 1600 – Weesp, 1653), 4 works
Vliet, Hendrick Cornelisz. van (Delft, 1611 – Delft, 1675), 2 works
Voet, Jacob-Ferdinand (Antwerp, 1639 – Paris, 1689), 1 work
Vois, Ary de (Utrecht, 1641 – Leiden, 1680), 7 works
Vollevens, Johannes (Geertruidenberg, 1649 – The Hague, 1728), 2 works
Vollevens, Johannes (The Hague, 1685 – The Hague, 1759), 1 work
Vonck, Elias (Amsterdam, 1605 – Amsterdam, 1652), 1 work
Vonck, Jan (Torun, Poland, 1631 – Amsterdam, 1664), 1 work
Vrel, Jacob (Delft, 1654 – Haarlem, 1662), 1 work
Vries, Jochem de (Sneek, 1600 – Delft, 1670), 1 work
Vries, Roelof Jansz. van (Haarlem, 1630 – Amsterdam, 1690), 1 work
Vromans, Isac (Delft, 1658 – Den Bosch, 1706), 1 work
Vucht, Gerrit van (Schiedam, 1610 – Schiedam, 1697), 1 work
Walraven, Isaac (Amsterdam, 1686 – Amsterdam, 1765), 1 work
Walscapelle, Jacob van (Dordrecht, 1644 – Amsterdam, 1727), 1 work
Wassenberg, Jan Abel (Groningen, 1689 – Groningen, 1750), 3 works
Waterloo, Anthonie (Lille, 1609 – Utrecht, 1690), 1 work
Weenix, Jan (Amsterdam, 1640 – Amsterdam, 1719), 3 works
Weenix, Jan Baptist (Amsterdam, 1621 – Utrecht, 1661), 4 works
Werff, Adriaen van der (Kralingen, 1659 – Rotterdam, 1722), 6 works
Werff, Pieter van der (Kralingen, 1665 – Rotterdam, 1722), 2 works
Westerbaen, Jan Jansz. (I) (1600 – 1686), 1 work
Westerveld, Abraham Evertsz. van (1620 – Rotterdam, 1692), 1 work
Wet, Gerrit de (Haarlem, 1620 – Leiden, 1674), 1 work
Wet, Jacob de (Haarlem, 1610 – Haarlem, 1675), 1 work
Wieringa, Nicolaas (1624 – 1681), 1 work
Wijck, Thomas (Beverwijk, 1616 – Haarlem, 1677), 3 works
Wijckersloot, Johannes van (Utrecht, 1630 – Amsterdam, 1687), 1 work
Wijnants, Jan (Haarlem, 1632 – Amsterdam, 1684), 7 works
Wijnen, Domenicus van (Amsterdam, 1661 – 1695), 1 work
Wijntrack, Dirck (Heusden, 1615 – The Hague, 1678), 1 work
Willeboirts Bosschaert, Thomas (Bergen op Zoom, 1613 – Antwerp, 1654), 2 works
Windtraken, J.W. (1680 – 1720), 2 works
Wit, Jacob de (Amsterdam, 1695 – Amsterdam, 1754), 2 works
Witte, Peter de (Antwerp, 1617 – Antwerp, 1667), 2 works
Withoos, Matthias (Amersfoort, 1627 – Hoorn, 1703), 1 work
Witte, Emanuel de (Alkmaar, 1617 – Amsterdam, 1692), 3 works
Wolters, Herman (Zwolle, 1682 – Haarlem, 1766), 1 work
Woutersin, L.J. (1610 – 1650), 1 work
Wouwerman, Jan (Haarlem, 1629 – Haarlem, 1666), 1 work
Wouwerman, Philips (Haarlem, 1619 – Haarlem, 1668), 15 works
Wouwerman, Pieter (Haarlem, 1623 – Amsterdam, 1682), 2 works
Wulfraet, Mathijs (Arnhem, 1648 – Amsterdam, 1727), 1 work
Zijl, Gerard Pietersz. van (Haarlem, 1609 – Amsterdam, 1665), 1 work
Zijl, Roeloff (c.1600 – Utrecht, 1630), 1 work

Born in the 18th century
Alberti, Jean-Eugène-Charles (Maastricht, 1777 – 1843), 3 works
Andriessen, Jurriaan (Amsterdam, 1742 – Amsterdam, 1819), 1 work
Apostool, Cornelis (Amsterdam, 1762 – Amsterdam, 1844), 1 work
Appelius, Jean (died Middelburg, 1790), 1 work
Assche, Henri van (Brussels, 1774 – Brussels, 1841), 1 work
Augustini, Jacobus Luberti (Haarlem, 1748 – Haarlem, 1822), 1 work
Backhuijzen, Gerrit (Amsterdam, 1721 – Rotterdam, 1760), 1 work
Baur, Nicolaas (Harlingen, 1767 – Harlingen, 1820), 4 works
Behr, Johann Philipp (Augsburg, 1720 – Frankfurt, 1756), 2 works
Bolomey, Benjamin Samuel (Lausanne, 1739 – Lausanne, 1819), 5 works
Brandt, Albertus Jonas (Amsterdam, 1788 – Amsterdam, 1821), 2 works
Brassauw, Melchior (Mechelen, 1709 – Antwerp, 1757), 1 work
Bree, Matheus Ignatius van (Antwerp, 1773 – Antwerp, 1839), 6 works
Breuhaus de Groot, Frans Arnold (1796 – 1875), 1 work
Brondgeest, Albertus (Amsterdam, 1786 – Amsterdam, 1849), 1 work
Burgh, Hendrick van der (Amsterdam, 1769 – 1858), 1 work
Buys, Jacobus (Amsterdam, 1724 – Amsterdam, 1801), 4 works
Coclers, Louis Bernard (Liège, 1770 – Liège, 1827), 3 works
Compe, Jan ten (Amsterdam, 1713 – Amsterdam, 1761), 1 work
Cuylenburgh, Cornelis van (Utrecht, 1758 – The Hague, 1827), 5 works
Daiwaille, Jean Augustin (Cologne, 1786 – Rotterdam, 1850), 3 works
Dasveldt, Jan (1770 – 1855), 2 works
Demarne, Jean-Louis (Brussels, 1752 – Paris, 1829), 1 work
Dreibholtz, Christiaan Lodewijk Willem (Utrecht, 1799 – Utrecht, 1874), 2 works
Drielst, Egbert (Groningen, 1745 – Amsterdam, 1818), 2 works
Dubois-Drahonet, Alexandre Jean (Paris, 1791 – Paris, 1834), 2 works
Ducorron, Julien Joseph (Ath, 1770 – Ath, 1848), 1 work
Dumesnil, Louis Michel (died Paris, 1739), 1 work
Eeckhout, Jacobus Josephus (Antwerp, 1793 – Paris, 1861), 2 works
Eelkema, Eelke Jelles (Leeuwarden, 1788 – Leeuwarden, 1839), 5 works
Ekels, Jan (Amsterdam, 1724 – Amsterdam, 1780), 2 works
Ekels, Jan II (Amsterdam, 1759 – Amsterdam, 1793), 3 works
Fargue van Nieuwland, Isaac Lodewijk la (1726 – 1805), 2 works
Fargue, Paulus Constantijn la (The Hague, 1728 – The Hague, 1782), 2 works
Favray, Antoine de (Bagnolet, 1706 – Malta, 1792), 1 work
Fournier, Jean (1703 – 1754), 2 works
Franck, Christoffel Frederik (Zwolle, 1758 – Bennebroek, 1816), 1 work
Geelen, Christiaan van (I) (Utrecht, 1755 – Utrecht, 1824), 2 works
Gérard, François (Rome, 1770 – Paris, 1837), 2 works
Haag, Tethart Philipp Christian (Kassel, 1737 – The Hague, 1812), 1 work
Hauck, August Christian (Mannheim, 1742 – Rotterdam, 1801), 2 works
Hendriks, Wybrand (Amsterdam, 1744 – Haarlem, 1831), 9 works
Hodges, Charles Howard (Portsmouth, 1764 – Amsterdam, 1837), 18 works
Hoopstad, Elisabeth Iosetta (Guyana, 1787 – Marseille, 1847), 1 work
Horemans, Jan Jozef II (Antwerp, 1714 – Antwerp, after 1790), 1 work
Horstok, Johannes Petrus van (Haarlem, 1745 – Haarlem, 1825), 1 work
Hove, Bartholomeus Johannes van (The Hague, 1790 – The Hague, 1880), 2 works
Hulswit, Jan (Amsterdam, 1766 – Amstelveen, 1822), 2 works
Humbert de Superville, David Pièrre Giottino (The Hague, 1770 – Leiden, 1849), 1 work
Humbert, Jean (Amsterdam, 1734 – Amstelveen, 1794), 1 work
Janson, Johannes (Ambon, Dutch East Indies, 1729 – Leiden, 1784), 1 work
Janson, Johannes Christiaan (Leiden, 1763 – The Hague, 1823), 2 works
Jelgerhuis, Johannes (Leeuwarden, 1770 – Amsterdam, 1836), 9 works
Kaldenbach, Johan Antoni (Zutphen, 1760 – Zutphen, 1818), 1 work
Kamphuijsen, Jan (Amsterdam, 1760 – Amsterdam, 1841), 1 work
Keun, Hendrik (Haarlem, 1738 – Haarlem, 1787), 3 works
Kieft, Jan (De Rijp, 1798 – Amsterdam, 1870), 1 work
Kleijn, Pieter Rudolph (Hooge Zwaluwe, 1785 – 1816), 3 works
Knip, Josephus Augustus (Tilburg, 1777 – Berlicum, 1847), 5 works
Knoll, François Cornelis (Rotterdam, 1772 – Utrecht, 1827), 1 work
Kobell, Hendrik (Rotterdam, 1751 – Rotterdam, 1779), 1 work
Kobell, Jan (Delfshaven, 1778 – Amsterdam, 1814), 3 works
Kooi, Willem Bartel van der (Augustinusga, 1768 – Leeuwarden, 1836), 5 works
Kruseman, Cornelis (Amsterdam, 1797 – Lisse, 1857), 15 works
Kuster, Conrad (Winterthur, 1730 –  1802), 2 works
Laan, Dirk Jan van der (Zwolle, 1759 – Zwolle, 1829), 1 work
Laquy, Willem Joseph (1738 – 1798), 3 works
Lauwers, Jacobus Johannes (Bruges, 1753 – Amsterdam, 1800), 1 work
Lelie, Adriaan de (Tilburg, 1755 – Amsterdam, 1820), 20 works
Liotard, Étienne (Geneve, 1702 – Geneve, 1789), 1 work
Loeff, Hillebrand Dirk (The Hague, 1774 – The Hague, 1845), 1 work
May, Jan Willem (Amsterdam, 1798 – Hoorn, 1826), 2 works
Meulemans, Adriaan (Dordrecht, 1763 – The Hague, 1835), 2 works
Michaëlis, Gerrit Jan (Amsterdam, 1775 – Haarlem, 1857), 1 work
Mijn, Cornelia van der (Amsterdam, 1709 – London, 1782), 1 work
Mijn, Frans van der (Düsseldorf, 1719 – London, 1783), 7 works
Mijn, George van der (London, 1723 – Amsterdam, 1763), 3 works
Mol, Woutherus (Haarlem, 1785 – Haarlem, 1857), 1 work
Morel, Jan Evert (Amsterdam, 1769 – Amsterdam, 1808), 2 works
Moritz, Louis (The Hague, 1773 – Amsterdam, 1850), 11 works
Muys, Nicolaes (Rotterdam, 1740 – Rotterdam, 1808), 1 work
Nachenius, Jan Jacob (1709 – 1750), 1 work
Nijmegen, Dionys (Rotterdam, 1705 – Rotterdam, 1798), 6 works
Nijmegen, Gerard van (Rotterdam, 1735 – Rotterdam, 1808), 1 work
Numan, Hermanus (1744 – 1820), 1 work
Oberman, Anthony (Amsterdam, 1781 – Amsterdam, 1845), 3 works
Oets, Pieter (Amsterdam, 1735 – Amsterdam, 1780), 1 work
Oliphant, Jacobus (1715 – Leiden, 1742), 1 work
Os, Georgius van (The Hague, 1782 – Paris, 1861), 3 works
Os, Jan van (Middelharnis, 1744 – The Hague, 1808), 1 work
Os, Maria Margaretha van (Middelharnis, 1779 – The Hague, 1862), 1 work
Os, Pieter Gerardus van (The Hague, 1776 – The Hague, 1839), 10 works
Ouwater, Isaac (Amsterdam, 1748 – Amsterdam, 1793), 3 works
Palthe, Jan (Deventer, 1717 – Leiden, 1769), 1 work
Perronneau, Jean-Baptiste (Paris, 1715 – Amsterdam, 1783), 2 works
Pieneman, Jan Willem (Abcoude, 1779 – Amsterdam, 1853), 18 works
Pitloo, Antonie Sminck (Arnhem, 1790 – Naples, 1837), 1 work
Pothoven, Hendrik (Amsterdam, 1725 – Amsterdam, 1807), 2 works
Prins, Johannes Huibert (The Hague, 1757 – Utrecht, 1806), 1 work
Prud'Hon, Pierre-Paul (Cluny, 1758 – Paris, 1823), 1 work
Quinkhard, Julius Henricus (Amsterdam, 1734 – Amsterdam, 1795), 2 works
Ravenswaay, Jan van (Hilversum, 1789 – Hilversum, 1869), 1 work
Regters, Tibout (Dordrecht, 1710 – Amsterdam, 1768), 13 works
Reyers, Nicolaas (Leiden, 1719 – Leiden, 1784), 1 work
Rheen, Theodorus Justinus (Amsterdam, 0 – Batavia, 1745), 1 work
Rode, Niels (Guldborgsund, 1732 – Copenhagen, 1794), 1 work
Sander Bakhuyzen, Hendrik van de (The Hague, 1795 – The Hague, 1860), 5 works
Sande Bakhuyzen, Julius Jacobus van de (The Hague, 1795 – The Hague, 1860), 3 works
Scheffer, Johann Baptist (Cassel, 1773 – Amsterdam, 1809), 2 works
Schelfhout, Andreas (The Hague, 1787 – The Hague, 1870), 2 works
Schmidt, George Adam (1791 – 1844), 1 work
Schoemaker Doyer, Jacobus (Crefeld, 1792 – Zutphen, 1867), 1 work
Schoenmakers, Johannes (1755 – 1842), 1 work
Schotel, Johannes Christiaan (Dordrecht, 1787 – Dordrecht, 1838), 2 works
Schouman, Aart (Dordrecht, 1710 – The Hague, 1792), 3 works
Schouman M, rtinus (Dordrecht, 1770 – Breda, 1848), 4 works
Schweickhardt, Hendrik Willem (North Rhine Westphalia, 1747 – London, 1797), 1 work
Spilman, Hendrik (Amsterdam, 1721 – Haarlem, 1784), 1 work
Spinny, Guillaume de (Brussels, 1721 – The Hague, 1785), 2 works
Stolker, Jan (Amsterdam, 1724 – Rotterdam, 1785), 1 work
Strij, Abraham van (Dordrecht, 1753 – Dordrecht, 1826), 4 works
Strij, Jacob van (Dordrecht, 1756 – Dordrecht, 1815), 5 works
Sypesteyn, Maria Machteld (Haarlem, 1724 – Heemstede, 1774), 1 work
Teerlink, Abraham (Dordrecht, 1776 – Rome, 1857), 2 works
Tischbein, Johann Friedrich August (Maastricht, 1750 – Heidelberg, 1812), 7 works
Troostwijk, Wouter Johannes van (Amsterdam, 1782 – Amsterdam, 1810), 4 works
Uppink, Harmanus (Amsterdam, 1765 – Amsterdam, 1791), 1 work
Uppink, Willem (Amsterdam, 1767 – Amsterdam, 1849), 2 works
Valois, Jean François (Paramaribo, 1778 – The Hague, 1853), 2 works
Hulst, Jan Baptist van der (Leuven, 1790 – Brussels, 1862), 3 works
Verboeckhoven, Eugène-Joseph (Warneton, 1798 – Brussels, 1881), 1 work
Verheyden, Mattheus (Breda, 1700 – The Hague, 1776), 9 works
Versteegh, Michiel (1756 – 1843), 3 works
Vianey, Joseph Pierre (Nantes, 1731 – Middelburg, 1765), 1 work
Voogd, Hendrik (Amsterdam, 1768 – Rome, 1839), 1 work
Wassenberg, Elisabeth Geertruida (Groningen, 1729 – Groningen, 1781), 1 work
Westenberg, George Pieter (Nijmegen, 1791 – Brummen, 1873), 1 work
Wierix, Henricus Franciscus (Amsterdam, 1784 – Nijmegen, 1858), 1 work
Wolff, Benjamin (Dessau, 1758 – Amsterdam, 1825), 1 work

Born in the 19th century
Abels, Jacobus Theodorus (Amsterdam, 1803 – Abcoude, 1866), 1 work
Allebé, August (Amsterdam, 1838 – Amsterdam, 1937), 8 works
Alma-Tadema, Lawrence (Dronrijp, 1836 – Wiesbaden, 1912), 3 works
Alma-Tadema, Laura (London), 1852 - Hindhead, 1909), 1 work
Altmann, Sybrand (Texel, 1822 – Amsterdam, 1890), 1 work
Apol, Louis (The Hague, 1850 – The Hague, 1936), 2 works
Artz, Adolph (The Hague, 1837 – The Hague, 1890), 3 works
Assendelft, Cornelis Albert van (Middelburg, 1870 – Amsterdam, 1945), 1 work
Bakker Korff, Alexander Hugo (The Hague, 1824 – Leiden, 1882), 4 works
Bashkirtseff, Marie-Konstantinowna (Poltava, 1860 – Paris, 1884), 1 work
Bastert, Nicolaas (Maarssen, 1854 – Loenen aan de Vecht, 1939), 1 work
Baur, Marius (The Hague, 1867 – Amsterdam, 1932), 10 works
Beek, Bernard van (Amsterdam, 1875 – Kortenhoef, 1941), 1 work
Behr, Carel Jacobus (The Hague, 1812 – The Hague, 1895), 1 work
Berg, Andries van den (The Hague, 1852 – The Hague, 1944), 3 works
Berg, Simon van den (Rotterdam, 1812 – Arnhem, 1891), 1 work
Berg, Willem van den (Amsterdam, 1886 – The Hague, 1970), 1 work
Beveren, Charles van (Mechelen, 1809 – Amsterdam, 1850), 3 works
Bilders, Gerard (Utrecht, 1838 – The Hague, 1865), 8 works
Bilders, Johannes Warnardus (Utrecht, 1811 – Oosterbeek, 1890), 2 works
Bilders-van Bosse, Marie (1837 – 1900), 1 work
Bisschop, Christoffel (Leeuwarden, 1828 – Scheveningen, 1904), 2 works
Bisschop-Swift, Kate (London, 1834 – The Hague, 1928), 1 work
Blaaderen, Gerrit Willem van (Amsterdam, 1873 – Bergen, 1935), 1 work
Bles, David (The Hague, 1821 – The Hague, 1899), 1 work
Bloeme, Herman Antonie de (The Hague, 1802 – The Hague, 1867), 1 work
Blommers, Bernardus Johannes (The Hague, 1845 – The Hague, 1914), 4 works
Bock, Théophile de (The Hague, 1851 – Haarlem, 1904), 6 works
Bombled, Karel Frederik (Amsterdam, 1822 – Chantilly, 1902), 1 work
Bonvin, Francois (Paris, 1817 – Saint-Germain-en-Laye, 1887), 1 work
Borselen, Jan Willem van (Gouda, 1825 – The Hague, 1892), 1 work
Bosboom, Johannes (The Hague, 1817 – The Hague, 1891), 2 works
Boulard, Auguste (1825 – 1897), 1 work
Breitner, George Hendrik (Rotterdam, 1857 – Amsterdam, 1923), 50 works
Brugghen, Guillaume Anne van der (Nijmegen, 1811 – Ubbergen, 1891), 4 works
Burgers, Hendricus Jacobus (1834 – 1899), 1 work
Burgh, Pieter Daniel van der (The Hague, 1805 – Rijswijk, 1879), 1 work
Calisch, Moritz (Amsterdam, 1819 – Amsterdam, 1870), 4 works
Cate, Siebe Johannes ten (Sneek, 1858 – Paris, 1908), 1 work
Cornet, Jacobus Ludovicus (Leiden, 1815 – Leiden, 1882), 1 work
Couwenberg, Henricus Wilhelmus (The Hague, 1814 – Amsterdam, 1845), 2 works
Craeyvanger, Gijsbertus (Utrecht, 1810 – Utrecht, 1895), 1 work
Cunaeus, Conradijn (1828 – 1895), 2 works
Daiwaille, Alexander Joseph (Amsterdam, 1818 – Brussels, 1888), 1 work
Dankmeijer, Charles (Amsterdam, 1861 – Scheveningen, 1923), 2 works
Derkinderen, Antoon (Den Bosch, 1859 – Amsterdam, 1925), 1 work
Derksen, Gijsbertus (Doesburg, 1870 – Arnhem, 1920), 1 work
Deutmann, Franz (Zwolle, 1867 – Blaricum, 1915), 1 work
Deventer, Willem Anthonie van (The Hague, 1824 – The Hague, 1893), 2 works
Dijsselhof, Gerrit Willem (1866 – Overveen, 1924), 1 work
Drift, Johannes Adrianus van der (The Hague, 1808 – Weert, 1883), 1 work
Dubourcq, Pierre Louis (Amsterdam, 1815 – Amsterdam, 1873), 1 work
Eerelman, Otto (Groningen, 1839 – Groningen, 1926), 1 work
Engelberts, Willem Jodocus Mattheus (Amsterdam, 1809 – Waalre, 1887), 1 work
Famars Testas, Willem de (Utrecht, 1834 – Arnhem, 1896), 1 work
Gabriël, Paul Joseph Constantin (Amsterdam, 1828 – Scheveningen, 1903), 5 works
Greive, Johan Conrad (Amsterdam, 1837 – Amsterdam, 1891), 1 work
Gruyter, Willem (jr.) (1817 – 1880), 1 work
Haanen, Adriana (Oosterhout, 1814 – Oosterbeek, 1895), 2 works
Haanen, George Gillis (Utrecht, 1807 – Bilsen, 1879), 1 work
Haanen, Remigius Adrianus (Oosterhout, 1812 – Bad Aussee, 1894), 1 work
Haas, Johannes Hubertus Leonardus de (Hedel, 1832 – Königswinter, 1908), 1 work
Hendoes, Louwrens (Woudrichem, 1822 – Woudrichem, 1905), 7 works
Hari, Johannes (The Hague, 1807 – The Hague, 1887), 1 work
Heemskerck van Beest, Jacob Eduard van (Kampen, 1828 – The Hague, 1894), 2 works
Heijl, Marinus (Utrecht, 1836 – Amsterdam, 1931), 1 work
Hem, Piet van der (1885 – 1961), 1 work
Hendriks, Frederik Hendrik (Arnhem, 1808 – Arnhem, 1865), 1 work
Hendriks, Sara (Renkum, 1846 – Naarden, 1925), 1 work
Hollander, Hendrik (Leeuwarden, 1823 – Amsterdam, 1884), 1 work
Hoppenbrouwers, Johannes Franciscus (The Hague, 1819 – The Hague, 1866), 2 works
Horst, J. van (1821 – 1874), 9 works
Hoynck van Papendrecht, Jan van (Amsterdam, 1858 – The Hague, 1933), 1 work
Hoytema, Theo van (The Hague, 1863 – The Hague, 1917), 1 work
Hubrecht, Bramine (1855 – 1913), 2 works
Israëls, Isaac (Amsterdam, 1865 – The Hague, 1934), 13 works
Israels, Jozef (Groningen, 1824 – Scheveningen, 1911), 12 works
Jamin, Diederik Franciscus (1838 – 1865), 1 work
Japy, Louis Aimé (Doubs, 1840 – Paris, 1916), 1 work
Jolly, Henri Jean Baptiste (Antwerp, 1812 – Amsterdam, 1853), 1 work
Jong, Jurjen de (Harlingen, 1807 – Harlingen, 1890), 1 work
Jongkind, Johan Barthold (Lattrop, 1819 – La Côte-Saint-André, 1891), 2 works
Josselin de Jong, Pieter de (1861 – 1906), 1 work
Karsen, Eduard (Amsterdam, 1860 – Amsterdam, 1941), 12 works
Karsen, Kasparus (Amsterdam, 1810 – Bieberich, 1896), 4 works
Kate, Herman ten (The Hague, 1822 – The Hague, 1894), 2 works
Kever, Hein (Amsterdam, 1854 – Laren, 1922), 4 works
Klombeck, Johann Bernard (Cleve, 1815 – Cleve, 1893), 1 work
Koekkoek, Barend Cornelis (Middelburg, 1803 – Cleve, 1862), 2 works
Kruseman, Jan Adam (Haarlem, 1804 – Haarlem, 1862), 9 works
Leickert, Charles Henri Joseph (Brussels, 1816 – Mainz, 1907), 2 works
Liernur, Willem Adriaan Alexander (The Hague, 1856 – Deventer, 1917), 1 work
Loebell, Mina (Vienna, 1890 – Dutch East Indies, 1921), 1 work
Lokhorst, Dirk van (Utrecht, 1818 – Utrecht, 1893), 1 work
Looy, Jac. van (Haarlem, 1855 – Haarlem, 1930), 2 works
 (The Hague, 1857 – The Hague, 1921), 4 works
Mankes, Jan (Meppel, 1889 – Eerbeek, 1920), 1 work
Maris, Jacob (The Hague, 1837 – Karlsbad, 1899), 28 works
Maris, Matthijs (The Hague, 1839 – London, 1917), 8 works
Maris, Willem (The Hague, 1844 – The Hague, 1910), 3 works
Maschaupt, Jan Hendrik (1826 – 1903), 2 works
Mauve, Anton (Zaandam, 1838 – Arnhem, 1888), 14 works
Meijer, Louis (Amsterdam, 1809 – Utrecht, 1866), 3 works
Mesdag, Hendrik Willem (Groningen, 1831 – The Hague, 1915), 7 works
Mesdag-van Houten, Sientje (Groningen, 1834 – The Hague, 1909), 1 work
Meulen, François Pieter ter (Bodegraven, 1843 – The Hague, 1927), 2 works
Monet, Claude (Paris, 1840 – Giverny, 1926), 1 work
Monnickendam, Martin (1874 – 1943), 1 work
Neuhuys, Albert (Utrecht, 1844 – Locarno, 1914), 2 works
Neuhuys, Jozef (Utrecht, 1841 – Warmond, 1889), 1 work
Neuman, Johan Heinrich (Cologne, 1819 – The Hague, 1898), 8 works
Nuijen, Wijnandus Johannes Josephus (The Hague, 1813 – The Hague, 1839), 2 works
Oosterzee, Hermannus Adrianus van (1863 – 1933), 1 work
Oppenoorth, Willem (1847 – 1905), 1 work
Opzoomer, Simon (Rotterdam, 1819 – Antwerp, 1878), 1 work
Os, Pieter Frederik van (Amsterdam, 1808 – Haarlem, 1892), 1 work
Philippeau, Carel Frans (1825 – 1897), 1 work
Pieneman, Nicolaas (Amersfoort, 1809 – Amsterdam, 1860), 9 works
Poggenbeek, Geo (Amsterdam, 1853 – Amsterdam, 1903), 3 works
Prooijen, Albert Jurardus van (Groningen, 1834 – Amsterdam, 1898), 1 work
Regteren Altena, Martinus van (1866 – 1908), 1 work
Riegen, Nicolaas (Amsterdam, 1827 – Amsterdam, 1889), 1 work
Rochussen, Charles (Rotterdam, 1814 – Rotterdam, 1894), 6 works
Roelofs, Willem (Amsterdam, 1822 – Berchem, 1897), 2 works
Roelofs, Willem (Scharbeek, 1874 – The Hague, 1940), 1 work
Ronner-Knip, Henriëtte (Amsterdam, 1821 - Ixelles, 1909), 1 work 
Roos, Cornelis François (1802 – 1884), 1 work
Roosenboom, Margaretha (Voorburg, 1843 – Voorburg, 1896), 3 works
Rossum du Chattel, Fredericus Jacobus van (Leiden, 1856 – Lost at Sea, 1917), 1 work
Rossum, Jan Cornelis van (Amsterdam, 1820 – Amsterdam, 1905), 1 work
Roth, George Andries (Amsterdam, 1809 – Amsterdam, 1887), 1 work
Saleh, Raden Sarief Bastaman (Dutch East Indies, 1811 – Dutch East Indies, 1880), 4 works
Salm, Ab (Amsterdam, 1801 – Amsterdam, 1876), 1 work
Sande Bakhuyzen, Gerardina Jacoba van de (1826 – 1895), 1 work
Saxen Weimar Eisenbach, Marie Alexandrine van (1886 – 1886), 1 work
Schaap, Egbert (1862 – 1939), 1 work
Schmidt, Willem Hendrik (Rotterdam, 1809 – Delft, 1849), 1 work
Scholten, Hendrik Jacobus (Amsterdam, 1824 – Heemstede, 1907), 3 works
Schotel, Petrus Johannes (Dordrecht, 1808 – Dresden, 1865), 4 works
Schouman, Izaak (1801 – 1878), 1 work
Schwartze, Johann Georg (Düsseldorf, 1814 – Amsterdam, 1874), 4 works
Schwartze, Thérèse (Amsterdam, 1851 – Amsterdam, 1918), 4 works
Slager, Piet (Amsterdam, 1841 – 1912), 2 works
Sluijters, Jan (Den Bosch, 1881 – Amsterdam, 1957), 1 work
Sluiter, Willy (Amersfoort, 1873 – The Hague, 1949), 1 work
Soeren, Gerrit Jacobus van (Amsterdam, 1859 – Amsterdam, 1888), 1 work
Spoel, Jacob (Rotterdam, 1820 – Rotterdam, 1868), 2 works
Springer, Cornelis (Amsterdam, 1817 – Hilversum, 1891), 2 works
Stortenbeker, Pieter (1828 – 1898), 1 work
Stroebel, Johannes Anthonie Balthasar (1821 – 1905), 1 work
Swan, John Macallan (Brentford, 1847 – 1910), 1 work
Szyndler, Pantaleon (Warsaw, 1846 – Warsaw, 1905), 1 work
Tavenraat, Johannes (Rotterdam, 1809 – Rotterdam, 1881), 1 work
Teenstra, Kornelis Douwes (Zuidhorn, 1813 – Groningen, 1873), 1 work
Temminck, Henriëtta Christina (The Hague, 1813 – The Hague, 1886), 1 work
Tholen, Willem Bastiaan (Amsterdam, 1860 – The Hague, 1931), 1 work
Tom, Jan Bedijs (Boskoop, 1813 – Leiden, 1894), 1 work
Toorop, Jan (Katwijk, 1858 – Bergen, 1928), 2 works
Trigt, Hendrik Albert van (Dordrecht, 1829 – Heiloo, 1899), 1 work
Velden, Petrus van der (Rotterdam, 1837 – Auckland, 1913), 1 work
Verschuur, Wouter (Amsterdam, 1812 – Vorden, 1874), 1 work
Verveer, Salomon (The Hague, 1813 – The Hague, 1876), 3 works
Veth, Jan (Dordrecht, 1864 – Amsterdam, 1925), 6 works
Vogel, Cornelis Johannes de (Dordrecht, 1824 – Dordrecht, 1879), 1 work
Vos, Maria (Amsterdam, 1824 – Oosterbeek, 1906), 2 works
Waay, Nicolaas van der (Amsterdam, 1855 – Amsterdam, 1936), 2 works
Waldorp, Anthonie (The Hague, 1803 – Amsterdam, 1866), 3 works
Weissenbruch, Jan (The Hague, 1822 – The Hague, 1880), 3 works
Weissenbruch, Jan Hendrik (The Hague, 1824 – The Hague, 1903), 6 works
Welie, Antoon van (Druten, 1866 – The Hague, 1956), 2 works
Westerbeek, Cornelis (sr.) (Sassenheim, 1844 – The Hague, 1903), 1 work
Wever, Cornelis (Amsterdam, 1748 – Amsterdam, 1792), 2 works
Weyand, Jacob Gerrit (Amsterdam, 1886 – Bakkum, 1960), 1 work
Wijsmuller, Jan Hillebrand (Amsterdam, 1855 – Amsterdam, 1925), 1 work
Winter, Abraham Hendrik (Utrecht, 1800 – Amsterdam, 1861), 1 work
Winterhalter, Franz Xaver (Sankt Blasien, 1805 – Frankfurt, 1873), 1 work
Witsen W, Willem (Amsterdam, 1860 – Amsterdam, 1923), 6 works
Zwart, Willem de (The Hague, 1862 – The Hague, 1931), 12 works

Born in the 20th century
Perlman, Suzanne (Budapest, 1922 – London, 2020), 1 work
Rol, Henricus (Amsterdam, 1906 – Nieuwkoop, 1992), 1 work
Schröder, Sierk (Ambon, 1903 – Wassenaar, 2002), 1 work
Willink, Carel (Amsterdam, 1900 – Amsterdam, 1983), 1 work

References

 Netherlands Institute for Art History
 "Dutch Paintings of the Seventeenth Century in the Rijksmuseum Amsterdam", Volume 1: Artists Born Between 1570 and 1600, by Jonathan Bikker, Yvette Bruijnen, Gerdien Wuestman, Everhard Korthals Altes, Jan Piet Filedt Kok, and Taco Dibbits, 2008 

Rijksmuseum Amsterdam
Lists of painters
Rijksmuseum
Netherlands-related lists